The Yaddo Handicap is an American Thoroughbred horse race held annually during the third week of August at Saratoga Race Course in Saratoga Springs, New York. The mile-and-an-eighth race on turf is open to fillies and mares, age three and older that were bred in the state of New York.

The race was run at a distance of seven furlongs from 1980 to 1982. It was run in two divisions in  1990, 1991, 1992, 2003, and 2005. Run on dirt prior to 1989, due to the turf course conditions in 1990 and 2002 it was switched to dirt.

The race is named for a community near Saratoga Springs for artists, writers, and composers.

Records
Speed record:
 1:46.45 – Irish Linnet (1994) (9 furlongs)
 1:40.12 – Bar of Gold (2017) ( furlongs)

Most wins:
 5 – Irish Linnet (1991, 1992, 1993, 1994, 1995)

Most wins by a jockey:
 4 – Pat Day (1985, 2000, 2003, 2004)

Most wins by a trainer:
 7 – Leo O'Brien (1991 (2), 1992, 1993, 1994, 1995, 1997)

Most wins by an owner:
 6 – Austin Delaney (1991 (2), 1992, 1993, 1994, 1995)

Winners

References

Restricted stakes races in the United States
Turf races in the United States
Mile category horse races for fillies and mares
Recurring sporting events established in 1980
Belmont Park
Horse races in New York (state)
1980 establishments in New York (state)